Millennium Kids is an international youth empowerment environmental organization based in Western Australia with affiliates in Canada, South Africa and other countries.

History
Millennium Kids was founded by four twelve-year-olds in 1996.

A small group of Western Australian students attended the United Nations ‘Leave It To Us’ environmental conference for children in the UK. Upon their return, they were disappointed with the level of youth involvement in local environment issues and decided to developing their own environmental conference, "Kids Helping Kids", with support of Perth Zoo, Department of Environment, Clean Up Australia, CALM and the City of South Perth. Following this, they founded Millennium Kids.

In 2000, they presented a series of "environmental challenges" to Environment Minister Cheryl Edwardes, who tabled them at Parliament.

In 2012, the Western Australia HQ was based in the Old Fremantle Prison. The group works with schools to arrange environmental and sustainability education, connecting pupils and teachers with local community groups. In 2014, the group organised projects to clean up the Swan River.

Organisation
Millennium Kids has affiliates in Canada and South Africa, with collaborative organisation links in Indonesia, China and Malaysia.

The organisation is a registered charity with tax deductible status. Millennium Kids is run by children aged 10–25 years. Educators, mentors and sponsors support them. In 2014 the president was Rachael Cochrain, and young people aged 18–25 become leaders and trainers.

Millennium Kids is directed by a Youth Board, with fifteen members aged between 10 and 25 years, and it is supported by the United Nations Environment Program Agenda 21, Chapter 25 Declaration states "national governments should pay more attention to the opinions and concerns of children regarding the environment’ and how it should be managed for future generations".

Canada
In Canada, as a not-for-profit organisation, Millennium Kids facilitates many environmental activities across Ontario (from Ottawa, Toronto, to Kitchener-Waterloo). A youth board is present in Ottawa and Kitchener-Waterloo, as well as a chapter starting up in 2006 through the school system in Toronto, Ontario. The youth board decides on what initiatives will be taken upon the year. Among the activities, the Car Free Festival are planned as initiatives in cooperation with other environmental/youth empowerment organisations that reside in the respective area of the initiative.

References

External links
Millennium Kids HQ Australia
Millennium Kids Canada

Non-profit organisations based in Western Australia
Youth empowerment organizations
Organizations established in 1996
Environmental charities based in Australia